Rodolphe Marchais, Chairman and CEO of Sabena technics and CEO of TAT.

Biography 

Rodolphe Marchais began his career in the Group in 1982.

He has held different positions, starting in the Group as Paris Orly Hub Manager, then as Network Manager of TAT’s express parcel subsidiary, TAT Express.

In 1986, he became CEO of Chronopost, a start up joint venture between TAT and the French Post Office specialising in express mail. Chronopost became a very successful business with the powerful leverage of 12 000 offices of the French Post.

By 1988, Rodolphe MARCHAIS was CEO of TAT Express and had achieved a good profitability of this business for TAT.
In 1990, he became the CEO of TAT European Airlines, the biggest subsidiary of TAT Group and participated in convincing British Airways to become a shareholder of this company which was operating the first private French domestic and European network.

In 1996, when TAT Group sold all its shareholding in the airline and express parcel businesses, Rodolphe MARCHAIS became President & CEO of TAT Group, replacing Michel MARCHAIS, his father and founder of the Group.

From that moment on, with Rodolphe Marchais at its head, TAT Group focused on its leasing and aircraft maintenance activities, through its subsidiaries, TAT leasing and Sabena technics.

In a decade, TAT Group increased its maintenance activity and took part in a concentration movement in a fragmented market: it acquired successively AOM Industries in 2000, Sabena technics (at the time maintenance subsidiary of the Belgian National Airline) in 2005 and EADS Sogerma Services as well as EADS Barfield in 2007, making his subsidiary, Sabena technics, the world’s third largest independent MRO.

Today, Sabena technics has all the necessary skills and agreements to perform maintenance on a large range of narrow and wide-body aircraft (Airbus, Boeing, Bombardier, Embraer, ATR,…) and has developed a very specific skill to perform maintenance in operational condition on different countries’ fleets, representing today 40% of its activity.

TAT  leasing, based in Ireland, pursued its development by investing in a regional aircraft fleet – essentially ATRs – which is placed in operational leasing through different operators worldwide. Thus, the company acquired more than 50 ATRs and also offers assistance services for sales, purchases, leasing as well as technical and financial database management.

Since 2006, still under the leadership of Rodolphe Marchais, TAT Group undertook the construction of offices intended for leasing and developed a 50 000 m² real estate stock, added to 255 000 m² of technical facilities occupied by its subsidiary Sabena technics.

Notes and references 

1956 births
Living people